PS-117 Karachi West-I is a constituency of the Provincial Assembly of Sindh.

General elections 2002 

General elections were held on 10 Oct 2002. Syed Mustafa Kamal of Muttahida Qaumi Movement won by 15,432 votes.

General elections 2008

General elections were held on 18 Feb 2008. Dr. Sagheer Ahmed of Muttahida Qaumi Movement won by 50,743 votes.

General elections 2013

General elections 2018

See also
 PS-116 Keamari-V
 PS-118 Karachi West-II

References

External links
 Election commission Pakistan's official website
 Awazoday.com check result
 Official Website of Government of Sindh

Constituencies of Sindh